As of Dec 2022, Go First serves a total of 37 destinations including 27 domestic and 10 international destinations with more than 325 flights daily.

List

See also
 Air India Express destinations
 Alliance Air destinations
 List of Vistara destinations
 List of SpiceJet destinations
 List of IndiGo destinations

References

Lists of airline destinations